Charles H. Mitchell (born May 25, 1940) is an American former academic administrator and professional American football player. He was the president of the Seattle Central Community College from 1987 to 2003 and the chancellor of the Seattle Community Colleges District from 2003 to 2008.

Education
Mitchell attended T.T. Minor Elementary School, Meany Junior High, and Garfield High School. He earned a bachelor's degree from the University of Washington, a master's degree from Seattle University, and a doctorate in education from Brigham Young University.

Athletics
Mitchell was a member of the Washington Huskies football team, a running back, and was a member of the team that won the 1961 Rose Bowl. He played professional football for six years with the Denver Broncos and Buffalo Bills.

Education career

Mitchell joined Seattle Central Community College in 1981 as a teacher and later dean of students. He became president of the college in 1987 and held that post until 2003, when he was named the chancellor of the Seattle Community Colleges District.

References

1940 births
Living people
American football running backs
Garfield High School (Seattle) alumni
Washington Huskies football players
Seattle University alumni
Brigham Young University alumni
Denver Broncos (AFL) players
Buffalo Bills players
American Football League players
20th-century American educators
21st-century American educators
Educators from Seattle